The 1954–55 season was Mansfield Town's 17th season in the Football League and 12th season in the Third Division North, they finished in 13th position with 45 points.

Final league table

Results

Football League Third Division North

FA Cup

Squad statistics
 Squad list sourced from

References
General
 Mansfield Town 1954–55 at soccerbase.com (use drop down list to select relevant season)

Specific

Mansfield Town F.C. seasons
Mansfield Town